The fourth season of The Fosters premiered on June 20, 2016 and ended on April 11, 2017. The season consisted of 20 episodes and stars Teri Polo and Sherri Saum as Stef Foster and Lena Adams, an interracial lesbian couple, who foster a girl, Callie  (Maia Mitchell) and her younger brother, Jude (Hayden Byerly) while also trying to juggle raising Latino twin teenagers, Mariana and Jesus  (Cierra Ramirez and Noah Centineo), and Stef's biological son, Brandon (David Lambert).

Premise 
In this season, Callie and a new friend, Aaron (Eliott Fletcher) team up to find out what happened to an old friend of hers after being convicted of a murder 6 years earlier, and go down a dangerous path that's filled with unwanted surprises. Meanwhile, after adopting AJ, Mike struggles with fatherhood while dealing with his girlfriend, Ana. Still recovering from his break up with Conor, Jude starts spending more time with Noah (Kalama Epstein), an avid gay churchgoing Christan who has a wild side. Mariana struggles to let go of Nick (Louis Hunter) after the incident at school. Jesus and Emma begin a strictly sexual relationship, and are considering getting back together. Stressing about getting into Juilliard, Brandon goes to desperate measures in order to secure his place in the school, which doesn't sit well with Lena.

Cast

Main cast
 Teri Polo as Stef Adams Foster
 Sherri Saum as Lena Adams Foster
 Noah Centineo as Jesus Adams Foster
 Hayden Byerly as Jude Adams Foster
 David Lambert as Brandon Foster
 Maia Mitchell as Callie Adams Foster
 Cierra Ramirez as Mariana Adams Foster
 Danny Nucci as Mike Foster

Recurring cast
 Tom Williamson as AJ Hensdale
 Jordan Rodrigues as Mat Tan
 Elliot Fletcher as Aaron Baker
 Amanda Leighton as Emma
 Kalama Epstein as Noah
 Izabela Vidovic as Taylor
 Louis Hunter as Nick Stratos
 Annika Marks as Monte Porter
 Denyse Tontz as Cortney Strathmore
 Brandon Quinn as Gabriel Duncroft
 Kerr Smith as Robert Quinn
 Alexandra Barreto as Ana Gutierrez
 Alex Skuby as Joe Gray
 Hugh Scott as Doug Harvey
 Levi Fiehler as Troy Johnson
 Daffany Clark as Daphne Keene
 Mark Totty as Craig Stratos
 Jared Ward as Drew Turner
 Michael Traynor as Craig 
 Adam Irigoyen as Kyle Snow
 Meg DeLacy as Grace Mullen
 Hope Olaidé Wilson as Diamond

Guest cast
 Annie Potts as Sharon Elkin
 Rob Morrow as Will
 Lorraine Toussaint as Dana Adams
 Bruce Davison as Stuart Adams
 Suzanne Cryer as Jenna Paul
 Madisen Beaty as Talya Banks
 Madison Pettis as Daria
 Bailee Madison as Sophia Quinn 
 Ashley Argota as Lou Chan
 April Parker Jones as Captain Roberts
 Noah Urrea as Todd
 Chad Todhunter as Patrick Molloy
 Jay Ali as Timothy

Episodes

References

2016 American television seasons 
2017 American television seasons
The Fosters (American TV series)